The Bermuda Weather Service is Bermuda's national meteorological service. It provides public, marine, tropical and aviation weather forecasts as well as warnings and climatolological services. The service began operations under contract from the Department of Airport Operations, Ministry of Transport and Tourism, in 1995. Prior to that, the island's meteorological services were provided by a US Navy base on the island.

References

External links
 

Organisations based in Bermuda
Organizations established in 1995
1995 establishments in Bermuda
Governmental meteorological agencies in North America